Bruce Lessels is an American slalom canoeist who competed in the 1980s. He won two medals at the 1987 ICF Canoe Slalom World Championships in Bourg St.-Maurice with a gold in the C-1 team event and a bronze in the C-1 event.

Bruce is currently married with two daughters and owns an outdoor adventure company called Zoar Outdoor in Western Massachusetts.

References
ICF medalists for Olympic and World Championships - Part 2: rest of flatwater (now sprint) and remaining canoeing disciplines: 1936-2007.

American male canoeists
Living people
Year of birth missing (living people)
Medalists at the ICF Canoe Slalom World Championships